"High on Me" is a song by Australian recording artist Guy Sebastian. It was released on 1 September 2017 as the lead single from Sebastian's eighth studio album, Conscious.

Sebastian said "'High on Me' poured out of me while I was in Bali on a writing trip, sitting back looking at the mountains, high on this life. I really wanted to create a soulful earworm that would make young and old want to get up out of their chair and enjoy the moment."

Reception
In a review of the album, Haydon Benfield of Renowned for Sound said the song has "an infectious sound", "funky guitars and R&B beats".

Track listing
Digital download
"High on Me" – 3:17

Charts

Release history

References

2017 songs
2017 singles
Guy Sebastian songs
Sony Music Australia singles
Songs written by Guy Sebastian
Songs written by Louis Schoorl
Songs written by Fiona Bevan